Heads Up is the first studio release by Canadian rock duo Death from Above. It was released December 15, 2002, through Ache Records. The album was produced by Al-P who would later work alongside Jesse F. Keeler in the electronic music duo MSTRKRFT.

Background 
Allmusic states the band takes cues from bands such as Lightning Bolt, Liars, and electroclash and describes the album as "minimalist, danceable racket with enough rock sensibilities for the indie kids and enough Throbbing Gristle for the art-noise lovers."

The song "Dead Womb" is notable for the intro with an electronic voice saying: "La cocaina no es buena para su salud (Translation: Cocaine is not good for your health) La cocaina is not good for you." Before the song dive bombs into a punk sounding song. Sebastien Grainger actually said the intro was an old text-to-voice program on one of his older computers that did that voice. Apparently the program had weird choices like "little boy" and such, and it just stuck.

Critical reception 

Tyler of Punknews.org concluded his review of the album saying "If you are looking for something fresh, raw, energetic and also unbelievably good to go running to, then get a "heads up" on this record immediately." He also compared the tracks to "techno-style sounds of synthesizer" and "blistering dance-punk"

Track listing

Personnel
Album personnel as listed in the 2005 reissue CD liner notes.

Death from Above
 Jesse F. Keeler – bass, vocoder, additional percussion, additional vocals, Illustration
 Sebastien Grainger – drums, vocals, additional percussion, additional vocals

Additional personnel
 Al-P – recording, additional percussion, additional vocals, layout

References 

2002 debut EPs
Death from Above 1979 albums
Last Gang Records albums